Atanas Vargov (born 19 May 1984) is a football midfielder from the Bulgaria currently playing for Dunav Rousse. He was raised in Sokol'96's youth teams. Vargov is a left midfielder.

Since the beginning of  football saison 2009/2010 Atanas Vargov plays football at TV Askania Bernburg, a football club in Germany.

External links

1984 births
Living people
Bulgarian footballers
Botev Plovdiv players
FC Dunav Ruse players
First Professional Football League (Bulgaria) players
Association football midfielders